Syed Abdus Sultan was a Member of the 3rd National Assembly of Pakistan as a representative of East Pakistan. He was the High Commissioner of Bangladesh to the United Kingdom.

Career
Sultan was a Member of the  3rd National Assembly of Pakistan representing Mymensingh-V.

Sultan served as the High Commissioner of Bangladesh to the United Kingdom in the early 1970s. On 22 July 1975, he was appointed the Ambassador of Bangladesh to Libya.

References

Pakistani MNAs 1962–1965
Living people
Year of birth missing (living people)
High Commissioners of Bangladesh to the United Kingdom